is a lake in Akita Prefecture in northern Japan. At 4 meters below sea level, Hachirōgata is the lowest natural point in Japan.

Hachirōgata was the second-largest lake in Japan after Lake Biwa. Extensive reclamation began in 1957 for crop production, and Ōgata village was established on the reclaimed land on October 1, 1964.

Some regard the reclamation as a mistake, since Japan began to be bothered with surplus rice soon after the completion of the reclamation.  Others lament the loss of the wetlands.

Fishery of shijimi shells (Corbicula japonica) was a thriving industry, but it decreased as the lake became less brackish.  In the winter, people fish wakasagi (Hypomesus nipponensis) by hollowing out the frozen surface.  Today, black bass fishing attracts tourists even outside the prefecture, though some suspect that indigenous species are threatened by the invasion of the extraneous fish.

Legend

According to a legend, a man called Hachirō was transformed into a dragon and chose the lake for his home after wandering a long time.  Thus, the lake was named Hachirō-gata (-gata means "lagoon").  Later, he was attracted to a woman who owned Lake Tazawa, another lake in Akita Prefecture, and moved to be with her.  After that, Hachirōgata became increasingly shallower.

External links 

World Lakes Database: Hachiro-gata
The memory of Oogata 

Lakes of Japan
Tourist attractions in Akita Prefecture
Landforms of Akita Prefecture
Extreme points of Japan
Polders
Lowest points